The Guishan Offshore Windfarm is a 198MW offshore wind farm near Zhuhai  in Guangdong province, China.

Construction
Construction of the Guishan Offshore Windfarm began in September 2016 by the facility's owner, Southern Offshore Wind Power Joint Development shortly after the approval of the project by the Guangdong Development & Reform Commission. By March 2018, the wind farm is already 75 percent complete and the facility already began generating electricity on March 13, 2018.

Facilities
The wind farm phase 1 project consists of 34 wind turbines each with a capacity of 3 MW each. Its phase 2 project consists of 15 wind turbines each with a capacity of 5.5 MW each.

See also

 Wind power in China
 List of wind farms in China

References

Offshore wind farms
Wind farms in China
2018 establishments in China
Buildings and structures in Zhuhai
Wanshan Archipelago
Energy infrastructure completed in 2018